Jamesville-DeWitt Central School District is a public school district that serves Jamesville, New York, and the town of DeWitt, New York. The school district consists of 2786 students in 5 schools (three K-4 elementary schools, one 5-8 middle school, and one 9-12 high school). The current superintendent is Dr. Peter Smith (Jan 2019). The Jamesville-DeWitt Central School District offices are located in DeWitt, New York.

Jamesville-DeWitt student test scores are listed in a New York Times article reporting New York State test scores by county.

Schools

Elementary (K-4)
 Jamesville Elementary School - Mrs. Marcy Baker, Principal.
 Moses Dewitt Elementary School - Mrs. Mary Sylvester, Principal. 
 Tecumseh Elementary School - Mrs. Jill Zerrillo, Principal.

Middle (5-8)
 Jamesville-Dewitt Middle School - Mr. Andy Eldridge, Principal.

High (9-12)
 Jamesville-DeWitt High School - Mr. Paul Gasparini, Principal.

Bird's Eye Images
 Jamesville Elementary School
 Moses Dewitt Elementary School
 Tecumseh Elementary School
 Jamesville-Dewitt Middle School
 Jamesville-Dewitt High School

References

External links

 Jamesville-DeWitt Central School District
 Teach at Jamesville-DeWitt

School districts in New York (state)
Education in Onondaga County, New York
DeWitt, New York